Interleukin-36 gamma previously known as interleukin-1 family member 9 (IL1F9) is a protein that in humans is encoded by the IL36G gene.

Expression 
IL36G is well-expressed in the epithelium of the skin, gut, and lung. In the skin IL36G is predominantly expressed in epidermal granular layer keratinocytes with little to no expression in basal layer keratinocytes.

Function 

The protein encoded by this gene is a member of the interleukin-1 cytokine family.  This gene and eight other interleukin-1 family genes form a cytokine gene cluster on chromosome 2. The activity of this cytokine is mediated via the interleukin-1 receptor-like 2 (IL1RL2/IL1R-rp2/IL-36 receptor), and is specifically inhibited by interleukin-36 receptor antagonist, (IL-36RA/IL1F5/IL-1 delta). Interferon-gamma, tumor necrosis factor-alpha and interleukin-1 β (IL-1β) are reported to stimulate the expression of this cytokine in keratinocytes. The expression of this cytokine in keratinocytes can also be induced by a multiple Pathogen-Associated Molecular Patterns (PAMPs). Both IL-36γ mRNA and protein have been linked to psoriasis lesions and has been used as a biomarker for differentiating between eczema and psoriasis.  As with many other interleukin-1 family cytokines IL-36γ requires proteolytic cleavage of its N-terminus for full biological activity.  However, unlike IL-1β the activation of IL-36γ is inflammasome-independent. IL-36γ is specifically cleaved by the endogenous protease cathepsin S as well exogenous proteases derived from fungal and bacterial pathogens.

References 

Biomarkers

Further reading